Brackin is both a surname and a given name. Notable people with the name include:

Thomas Brackin (1859–1924), English cricketer
Brackin Karauria-Henry (born 1988), New Zealand rugby player

See also
Bracken (disambiguation)